VedicBrahman.com is an Indian electronic commerce startup which provides priests for Hindu Puja services. They currently offer services in 30 cities in India and they also claim that in near future they will provide services in 16 cities outside of India. As per the media reports it is India's first online portal which provides Vedic priests of Varanasi.

As per BusinessInsider.com the company has 70 Vedic Brahmins on board with them. As per Indian media reports, it is first of its kind of online religious services platform.

Services 
VedicBrahman.com provides priests to perform Hindu rituals. As per Economic times Vedicbrahman.com is targeting break even of the business by the end of 2017.

References 

E-commerce in India
Puja (Hinduism)
Religious websites